Serkan Asan (born 28 April 1999) is a Turkish professional footballer who plays as a right back for Trabzonspor.

Professional career
Asan is a youth product of the Trabzonspor academy, and signed his first professional contract with them in 2019. He began his senior career on loan with 1461 Trabzon for the 2018-19 season in the TFF Third League. He made his professional debut for Trabzonspor in a 3–1 UEFA Europa League loss to FC Krasnodar on 7 November 2019.- He helped Trabzonspor win the 2021–22 Süper Lig trophy.

International career
Asan is a youth international for Turkey, having played for the Turkey U21s in October 2020.

Honours
Trabzonspor
Turkish Cup: 2019–20
Turkish Super Cup: 2020, 2022
 Süper Lig: 2021–22

References

External links
 
 
 

1999 births
Living people
People from Akçaabat
Turkish footballers
Turkey under-21 international footballers
Trabzonspor footballers
Süper Lig players
Association football fullbacks